Wayne Douglas Legursky II (born June 9, 1986) is a former American football center. He was signed by the Steelers as an undrafted free agent in 2008. He played college football at Marshall.

Legursky has also played for the Buffalo Bills and San Diego Chargers.

High school career
He played at Woodrow Wilson High School in Beckley, West Virginia. The 2003 Hunt Award Winner as the best lineman in the state of West Virginia, was awarded to Legursky. On September 4, 2009, Legursky was inducted to the Woodrow Wilson Football Hall Of Fame.

College career
He set 2 Marshall weight room records for the squat (705 lbs.) and the hang clean (430 lbs.) as a three-year starter at Marshall.

Professional career

Pittsburgh Steelers
Legursky signed with the Pittsburgh Steelers as an undrafted free agent on April 28, 2008. He was released on June 28 but re-signed the following day. Legursky was released by the team during final cuts on August 30, but re-signed to the team's practice squad on October 1 after guard Kendall Simmons was placed on injured reserve.

Legursky replaced Pouncey during the Steelers's 24-19 AFC Championship Game win on January 23, 2011. Legursky started his very first game at center in Super Bowl XLV due to Pro Bowl rookie Maurkice Pouncey's ankle injury. Although Legursky fumbled a snap to quarterback Ben Roethlisberger on the goal line resulting in a Jets safety, he helped RB Rashard Mendenhall run for a playoff career-high 121 yards and one touchdown. The Steelers lost to the Green Bay Packers 31–25 in Super Bowl XLV. After not being re-signed by the Steelers after the 2010–2011 season, Legursky became an unrestricted free agent.

Buffalo Bills
On June 5, 2013, Legursky signed with the Buffalo Bills.

San Diego Chargers
On September 11, 2014, Legursky signed with the San Diego Chargers. He replaced Nick Hardwick, who had been injured and out for the rest of the season.

Pittsburgh Steelers (second stint)
On August 25, 2015, it was announced that the Pittsburgh Steelers had re-signed Legursky. He was released on September 5, 2015 but re-signed the next day after Maurkice Pouncey was placed on injured reserve.

References

External links
Marshall Thundering Herd bio
Pittsburgh Steelers bio
San Diego Chargers bio

1986 births
Living people
American football centers
American football offensive guards
Buffalo Bills players
Marshall Thundering Herd football players
Sportspeople from Beckley, West Virginia
Pittsburgh Steelers players
Players of American football from West Virginia
San Diego Chargers players
Sportspeople from Frankfurt
Woodrow Wilson High School (Beckley, West Virginia) alumni